Walter L. Davis (born July 2, 1979) is an American athlete competing in the triple jump and occasionally in the long jump. He was born in Lafayette, Louisiana

Davis won the 2005 World Outdoor and 2006 World Indoor Championships.

However, his greatest claim to fame may have occurred in the 2004 Olympic Trials, where in the later rounds of the final he put in an extraordinary jump, during the landing phase of which he lost control, with his foot hitting the sand a significant distance behind his rump, which is the usual area of the body which lands first in the sand. The jump had to be measured from first body contact with the sand, the foot, which was an official 17.63m. The distance of the jump to where his rump landed in the sand was at least 18 m from video analysis.

Davis was a member of the Louisiana State University track and field team.

In the period from July 2012 to 2013, he missed three mandatory drug tests. This resulted in a one-year ban from the sport.

Achievements 
2006 IAAF World Indoor Championships - gold medal
2005 World Championships in Athletics - gold medal
2004 Summer Olympics - 11th place
2003 IAAF World Indoor Championships - silver medal
2003 World Championships in Athletics - seventh place (long jump)
2001 World Championships in Athletics - fifth place
1st IAAF World Athletics Final - second place

References

External links
 
 Walter Davis at the U.S. Olympic Team
 
 

1979 births
Living people
Sportspeople from Lafayette, Louisiana
Track and field athletes from Louisiana
American male triple jumpers
African-American male track and field athletes
Athletes (track and field) at the 2000 Summer Olympics
Athletes (track and field) at the 2004 Summer Olympics
Olympic track and field athletes of the United States
World Athletics Championships medalists
LSU Tigers track and field athletes
American sportspeople in doping cases
Doping cases in athletics
Junior college men's track and field athletes in the United States
Barton Cougars men's track and field athletes
World Athletics Indoor Championships winners
World Athletics Championships winners
21st-century African-American sportspeople
20th-century African-American sportspeople